is a train station in Hayashima, Tsukubo District, Okayama Prefecture, Japan.

Lines
West Japan Railway Company
Uno Line

Adjacent stations

|-
!colspan=5|JR West

References 
 http://www.jr-odekake.net/eki/top.php?id=0651606

Railway stations in Okayama Prefecture